Molleda is one of seven parishes (administrative divisions) in the Corvera de Asturias municipality, within the province and autonomous community of Asturias, in northern Spain.

The population is 717 (INE 2006).

Villages
Barrio Molleda 
Candamo
Carruébano (Carruébanu)
Castiello (Castiellu)
El Barrial
El Molino (El Molín)
Moncó
El Pidre
El Pino (El Pinu)
El Sabledal
Entrialgo
Esquilera
La Estebanina (Estebanina)
García
Grandellana
Juncedo Campo (Xuncéu)
La Cogulla
La Escuela (La Llaguna)
La Peluca
La Reguera
La Sierra
La Trapa
Lavandera (Llavandera)
Llandones
Los Espinos
Peruyal (La Peruyal)
Ralla
Villanueva

References 

Parishes in Corvera de Asturias